Thomas Philip Hamer (born 01 October 1999) is an English professional footballer who plays as a right back or centre back for Burton Albion.

Early life
Hamer was born in Bolton, Greater Manchester.

Career
Hamer started his career with Oldham Athletic's youth academy in 2015. He made his first-team debut for Oldham on 17 January 2018 when he played the first 69 minutes of the 4–2 victory over Leicester City U23 in the EFL Trophy. Six days later, in the same competition, he played 57 minutes of a 2–1 away defeat to Shrewsbury Town. He was an unused substitute for games against Rotherham United and Plymouth Argyle. Hamer made his league debut in League One in April, playing at centre back after Kean Bryan limped off 18 minutes into the game against Oxford United. He made his full league debut against local rivals Rochdale on 17 April 2018.

On 24 April 2018, Hamer signed a two-year professional contract at Oldham; the same day he also received the Man of the Match award in a 3–0 defeat against Southend United. He scored his first goal for the club during a 2–2 draw with Northampton Town on 5 May, when he headed in a Jack Byrne cross on the 55th minute.

On 29 January 2021, Hamer joined League One side Burton Albion for an undisclosed fee.

Style of play
Hamer plays mostly as a right back but can also play as a centre back; his former manager Richie Wellens also said he can play defensive midfield. He became known for his long throw-ins when both of Athletic's goals in a 2–2 draw with AFC Wimbledon were the result of his thrown-ins.

Career statistics

References

1999 births
Living people
Footballers from Bolton
English footballers
Association football defenders
Oldham Athletic A.F.C. players
Burton Albion F.C. players
English Football League players